Ben Douglas may refer to:

 Ben Elbert Douglas Sr. (1894–1981), mayor of Charlotte, North Carolina
 Ben Douglas (American football) (1909–1985), American football player and coach